Rubén Verges (born 11 March 1987 in Barcelona) is a Spanish snowboarder. He placed 31st in the men's halfpipe event at the 2010 Winter Olympics.

References

1987 births
Living people
Sportspeople from Barcelona
Spanish male snowboarders
Olympic snowboarders of Spain
Snowboarders at the 2010 Winter Olympics
Universiade gold medalists for Spain
Universiade medalists in snowboarding
Competitors at the 2013 Winter Universiade
21st-century Spanish people